Roods Creek is a river in Delaware County, New York. It begins just south of Cannonsville Reservoir and flows south into Crystal Lake. After exiting Crystal Lake it continues flowing south and then flows into Silver Lake. After exiting Silver Lake it continues southward before converging with the West Branch Delaware River east of the hamlet of Hale Eddy.

References

Rivers of New York (state)
Rivers of Delaware County, New York
Tributaries of the West Branch Delaware River